Brne Karnarutić (1515–1573) was a Croatian Renaissance poet. His most famous work was Vazetje Sigeta grada, a historical epic on the Battle of Szigetvár.

Life
He was born in Zadar, probably in 1515, from an old noble family. After schooling in Zadar he studied law, probably in Padua. He served as a captain in the army of the Republic of Venice, leading a Croatian cavalry squad in the Ottoman–Venetian War (1537–1540). Afterwards he worked as a lawyer in Zadar, where he deceased probably in 1573.

Works

He adapted Ovid's metamorphosis on Pyramus and Thisbe under the title of Izvrsita ljubav i napokon nemila i nesrićna smrt Pirama i Tizbe (Venice, 1586). Much more famous is Karnarutić's other work - Vazetje Sigeta grada (Venice, 1584), the first Croatian historical epic on the Battle of Szigetvár and the death of Nikola IV Zrinski and courageous defenders of Szigetvár (1566)

References

External links

1515 births
1573 deaths
16th-century Croatian poets
16th-century male writers
16th-century Croatian people
Republic of Venice poets
Croatian male poets
Writers from Zadar
Venetian Slavs